Cheliuskinets is an urban-type settlement in Luhansk Raion (district) in Luhansk Oblast of eastern Ukraine. Population:

Demographics
Native language distribution as of the Ukrainian Census of 2001:
 Ukrainian: 33.23%
 Russian: 65.56%
 Others: 0.24%

References

Urban-type settlements in Luhansk Raion